The 2021 Wigan Metropolitan Borough Council election took place on 6 May 2021 to elect members of Wigan Metropolitan Borough Council in England. This election was held on the same day as other local elections. The election was originally due to take place on 7 May 2020, but was postponed due to the COVID-19 pandemic. A by-election was held on the same day in Orrell ward to fill the seat left vacant by the death of Conservative councillor Richard Clayton.

Overview
Prior to the election, the composition of the council was:

Labour Party: 57
Conservative Party: 7
Independent: 10
Vacant: 1

After the election, the composition of the council was: 
Labour Party: 57
Conservative Party: 8
Independent: 10

Results Summary

Results

Bolton West constituency

Atherton ward

Leigh constituency

Astley Mosley Common ward

Atherleigh ward

Golborne and Lowton West ward

Leigh East ward

Leigh South ward

Leigh West ward

Lowton East ward

Tyldesley ward

Makerfield constituency

Abram ward

Ashton ward

Bryn ward

Hindley ward

Hindley Green ward

Orrell ward

In the percentage change column, the candidate with the most votes from each party is compared with the 2016 Orrell ward result, whilst the candidate with the least votes from each party is compared with the 2018 Orrell ward result.

Winstanley ward

Worsley Mesnes ward

Wigan constituency

Aspull, New Springs and Whelley ward

Douglas ward

Ince ward

Pemberton ward

Shevington with Lower Ground ward

Standish with Langtree ward

The "Standish Independents" description was used at the last election by the Wigan Independents, a separate political party.

Wigan Central ward

Wigan West ward

By-elections between 2021 and 2022

Leigh West ward

Bryn ward

References

2021

2020s in Greater Manchester
Wigan
May 2021 events in the United Kingdom
May 2020 events in the United Kingdom